Joe Uecker (born November 27, 1954) is a former Republican member of the Ohio Senate, representing the 14th District from 2013 to 2019.  He formerly served in the Ohio House of Representatives from 2005 to 2012.

Career
Uecker worked in law enforcement for the City of Deer Park, Clermont County Sheriff's Office, and the City of Montgomery before parlaying his management degree into the private sector in 1988. He also co-owned a private business for three years. Uecker worked as the Administrator of the Clermont County Engineer's Office from 1993 until 2004 and was also a Miami Township Trustee from 1990 until 2004.

When incumbent Jean Schmidt decided to run for the Ohio Senate, Uecker was one of five who ran for her open House seat. He  won with 40.26% of the electorate. He ran unopposed in the general election, and began his term in 2005.

In 2006, he won a second term against Democrat William Newby with 63.59% of the vote, and again ran unopposed for a third term in 2008. For a final term in 2010, Uecker defeated Libertarian Barry Cox with 79.94% of the vote.

Ohio Senate
In 2012, Uecker was term limited from the Ohio House of Representatives and opted to run for an open seat in the Ohio Senate.  He won a four way primary with 42.37% of the vote.  He was unopposed in the general election. Uecker resigned on August 31, 2019 to take a position with the Ohio Department of Transportation (ODOT).

References

External links
Joe Uecker for State Senate official campaign site

Living people
Republican Party members of the Ohio House of Representatives
People from Loveland, Ohio
1954 births
Republican Party Ohio state senators
21st-century American politicians